Dorothy Montana Coburn (June 8, 1905 – May 15, 1978) was an American film actress who appeared in a number of early Laurel and Hardy silents. She was a niece of author Walt Coburn and granddaughter of Robert Coburn Sr., founder of the Circle C Ranch in Montana.

Early years
Coburn was born to cowboy-poet and Western film producer Wallace Coburn and Ann Reifenrath Coburn in Great Falls, Montana but raised in Prescott, Arizona.

Career
Her documented film repertoire consisted of 16 silent short subjects for the Hal Roach studios, and she appeared in scores of films as horseback-stuntwoman opposite such stars as Gary Cooper and Joel McCrea, and as a stand-in for Ginger Rogers in several of her dancing films with Fred Astaire. Coburn retired from the movie business in the early 1930s. An accomplished rider and a fit athlete, Coburn occasionally worked as a stunt performer in westerns.

Later years
After leaving the movie business in 1936, she found employment as a receptionist for an insurance company. She was married twice. Coburn died in 1978, aged 72, from emphysema.  She is interred in Grand View Memorial Park Cemetery in Glendale, California.

Before her death, Dorothy Coburn lived in Rancho Palos Verdes with her second husband, Harry W. Heap.  Mr. Heap would die in Sandoval, New Mexico on January 7,1994.  They married in 1973 in Santa Barbara, CA. Her previous husband was Joseph Maier who died in Santa Barbara on March 4, 1959.

Filmography

 The Battle of the Century (1927)
 Putting Pants on Philip (1927)
 Us (1927)
 Hats Off (1927)
 The Second Hundred Years (1927)
 Sailors, Beware! (1927)
 Sugar Daddies (1927)
 All for Geraldine (1928)
 The Cross Country Bunion Race (1928)
 Do Gentlemen Snore? (1928)
 Look Pleasant (1928)
 That Night (1928)
 Rubber Necks (1928)
 Should Married Men Go Home? (1928)
 Barnum & Ringling, Inc. (1928)
 From Soup to Nuts (1928)
 The Finishing Touch (1928)
 Flying Elephants (1928)
 Leave 'Em Laughing (1928)
 Playin' Hookey (1928)
 Sailor Suits (1929)
 Up and Down Stairs (1930)
 Hot – And How! (1930)
 Shivering Shakespeare (1930)

References

External links
 
 

1905 births
1978 deaths
20th-century American actresses
Actresses from Arizona
Actresses from Montana
American silent film actresses
American stunt performers
Burials at Grand View Memorial Park Cemetery
Deaths from emphysema
Hal Roach Studios actors
People from Great Falls, Montana
People from Prescott, Arizona